Morten Nielsen (born 18 September 1980) is a Danish rower. He competed in the men's coxless pair event at the 2008 Summer Olympics.

References

External links
 

1980 births
Living people
Danish male rowers
Olympic rowers of Denmark
Rowers at the 2008 Summer Olympics
People from Fredensborg Municipality
Sportspeople from the Capital Region of Denmark